Mulama is a surname. Notable people with the surname include:

Simeon Mulama (born 1980), Kenyan footballer
Titus Mulama (born 1980), Kenyan footballer

Surnames of Kenyan origin